Raimo Manninen may refer to:

 Raimo Manninen (athlete) (born 1955), Finnish retired javelin thrower
 Raimo Manninen (alpine skier) (1940–2009), Finnish alpine skier